Choromytilus meridionalis, the black mussel, is a species of bivalve. It is a marine mollusc in the family Mytilidae.

Distribution
This species is found only around the southern African coast, from central Namibia to Port Elizabeth, from the low intertidal to about 10m.

Description
This animal grows up to 150 mm in length. It is a shiny black mussel which grows clustered in groups on rocks and in sandy areas. It is narrower and blacker
than the Mediterranean mussel, Mytilus galloprovincialis, with which it is often confused.

Ecology
The black mussel is a filter feeder that eats floating scraps of algae and phytoplankton. It is threatened by the invasion of the fast-growing and hardy Mediterranean mussel, which outcompetes it for space.

References

Mytilidae
Bivalves described in 1848